Stacy Title (February 21, 1964January 11, 2021) was an American film director, screenwriter and producer. Her films include Let the Devil Wear Black (1999), The Last Supper (1995), and Down on the Waterfront (1993), for which she was nominated for an Academy Award.

Career
Title's first project was Down on the Waterfront (1993), a short film nominated for the Academy Award for Best Live Action Short Film at the 66th Academy Awards. Her first feature film, The Last Supper (1995), is a comedy about graduate students who plan to murder right-wing militants.

Title was married to writer-actor and Survivor contestant Jonathan Penner, with whom she collaborated on several movies. She first directed Penner in The Last Supper. Together, they wrote the script for the 2003 WB-produced re-imagining of The Lone Ranger, starring Chad Michael Murray and Nathaniel Arcand. She later directed the 2017 horror film The Bye Bye Man, from a script by Penner. She and Penner were previously developing a King Kong television series for MarVista Entertainment and IM Global Television. She was also developing a dark comedy film called Walking Time Bomb following the release of The Bye Bye Man.

Personal life
Title grew up in New York, and her father was a commercial producer. She married Jonathan Penner on September 14, 1991; the couple had two children together. Title was a first cousin of Daena Title, who is married to Seinfeld actor Jason Alexander. Alexander was slated to star in Walking Time Bomb before Title's death.

Illness and death
In December 2017, Title was diagnosed with ALS, though she continued to work on Walking Time Bomb despite her illness and though as her illness progressed she was unable to walk, talk or swallow. The film was never completed.

Title died on January 11, 2021, at the age of 56. Her husband Jonathan Penner announced her death via Twitter.

Filmography

Director
 Freakish (2017) – Episode: "Trust Issues"
 The Bye Bye Man (2017)
 The Greatest Show Ever (2007)
 Hood of Horror (2006)
 Let the Devil Wear Black (1999)
 The Last Supper (1995)
 Down on the Waterfront (1993)

Writer
 2003: The Lone Ranger
 1999: Let the Devil Wear Black
 1993: Down on the Waterfront

Producer
 The Lone Ranger (2003)
 Let the Devil Wear Black (1999)
 The Last Supper (1995)
 Down on the Waterfront (1993)

Cameo
 2006: Survivor: Cook Islands (episode, "Arranging a Hit"), as Jonathan's loved one

References

External links
 
 Interview, including biographical information
 Stacy Title at Find a Grave

1964 births
2021 deaths
American women film directors
American women screenwriters
Neurological disease deaths in California
Deaths from motor neuron disease
Place of birth missing
21st-century American women
Burials at Hollywood Forever Cemetery